Albucilla (1st-century) was a Roman noblewoman, the wife of Satrius Secundus, and was known for having had many lovers.  

In the last year of the reign of the emperor Tiberius, 37 AD, she was accused of treason, or impiety, against the emperor along with Gnaeus Domitius Ahenobarbus, Vibius Marsus, and Lucius Arruntius.  As a result, she was imprisoned by command of the senate after making an unsuccessful attempt to commit suicide.

See also
 Albucia gens

References

1st-century Roman women
Romans from unknown gentes
Albucii